The 2014–15 AWIHL season is the eighth season of the Australian Women's Ice Hockey League. It ran from 25 October 2015 until 15 February 2015.

Regular season
The regular season ran from 25 October 2014 to 15 February 2015.

October

November

December

January

February

Standings
Note: GP = Games played; W = Wins; SW = Shootout Wins; SL = Shootout losses; L = Losses; GF = Goals for; GA = Goals against; GDF = Goal differential; PTS = Points

The regular season league standings are as follows:

Scoring leadersNote: GP = Games played; G = Goals; A = Assists; Pts = Points; PIM = Penalty minutesLeading goaltendersNote: GP = Games played; Mins = Minutes played; W = Wins; L = Losses: OTL = Overtime losses; SL = Shootout losses; GA = Goals Allowed; SO = Shutouts; GAA = Goals against average''

Playoffs

The finals series was hosted in Adelaide, South Australia, at Ice Arena (Adelaide) over the weekend of 21–22 February 2015.

Quarter Final Game 1

Quarter Final Game 2

Semi-final

Bronze-medal game

Gold-medal game

See also

Ice Hockey Australia
Joan McKowen Memorial Trophy

References

External links 
Australian Women's Hockey League official site
Adelaide Adrenaline official site
Brisbane Goannas official site
Melbourne Ice official Site
Sydney Sirens

Australian Women's Ice Hockey League seasons
Aust
ice hockey
ice hockey